The Club Swan 50 is the only design built by Nautor's Swan designed by Juan Kouyoumdjian to date. It was launched on 4 July 2016 as part of the company's 50th anniversary. It is the most performance-orientated design the brand has produced and has a number of unusual features more commonly associated with experimental race boats and aggressively styled performance cruiser. Example of this include a reverse bow "dreadnought bow" and twin rudder with turbulators on the leading edge and unusually a deck stepped mast. The yacht has had a very good reception by the experts.

Events

World Championships

Swan Nations Cup
A brand event competing for a "Nations Trophy" the event also commonly incorporates the class's own World Championship.

External links
 Class Association website
 Nautor Swan
 Designer Website
 World Sailing Microsite

References

Classes of World Sailing
Sailing yachts
Keelboats
2010s sailboat type designs
Sailboat types built by Nautor Swan
Sailboat type designs by Juan Kouyoumdjian